Charles Alexander De Melo (born 26 September 1989) is a British actor. From 2017 to 2022, he portrayed the role of Imran Habeeb on the ITV soap opera Coronation Street, for which he was nominated for the British Soap Award for Best Leading Performer.

Life and career
De Melo was born on 26 September 1989 in Barnstaple, Devon, and later moved to London, where he attended the University of London. He later graduated from ArtsEd in 2012. He began his acting career in 2012, appearing in the short films Rewind and Innocence. In 2013, he appeared as Tamir Niaz in an episode of the BBC soap opera Doctors. In 2014, he portrayed Josh Ware in an episode of Casualty, and in 2015, De Melo was cast in the BBC One drama series The Interceptor as Martin, a former MI6 agent and a member of the UNIT team. In 2016, he appeared in the direct-to-video sequel Jarhead 3: The Siege. In 2017, De Melo appeared in EastEnders as PC Jaz Jones on a recurring basis, appearing in five episodes. Later that year, he provided additional voices for the video game Need for Speed Payback.

In November 2017, De Melo joined the cast of the ITV soap opera Coronation Street as Imran Habeeb. The character was introduced as the brother of established character Rana Habeeb (Bhavna Limbachia) and arrives to attend Rana's wedding. The character returned in January 2018, after being promoted to a regular character, with storylines including his relationship with Toyah Battersby (Georgia Taylor), a one-night stand with Abi Franklin (Sally Carman which results in Abi getting pregnant and a custody battle for their son. In March 2022, it was announced that De Melo had decided to leave the soap, and Imran was killed off after sustaining injuries in a car accident and ultimately dying of cardiac arrest in scenes broadcast in June 2022. Following his exit from the soap, De Melo announced he would be starring in a theatre adaption of The Clothes They Stood Up In, based on the 2001 book by Alan Bennett and in 2023, he is set to appear as Borachio in the play Much Ado About Nothing.

Filmography

Stage

Awards and nominations

References

External links
 

1989 births
21st-century British male actors
British male soap opera actors
British male stage actors
Living people
People from Barnstaple